Shadows at the Door: The Podcast is a horror anthology podcast created by Mark Nixon and David Ault. The show typically features ghost stories, with a mixture of new pieces, including some written by Nixon, and public domain works such as those of M. R. James. Episodes consist of a story followed by a conversation between Nixon and Ault in which they discuss the story and the characters. The music is provided by Nico Vettese of We Talk of Dreams; Vettese's work on Shadows at the Door was a finalist in the 2020 AudioVerse Awards in the category for 'Instrumental Composition in a Production'. In 2022 the podcast featured a three-episode adaptation of Oscar Wilde's The Picture of Dorian Gray, with Jake Benson as Dorian Gray.

References

External links 

 
 

Audio podcasts
2018 podcast debuts
Horror podcasts
British podcasts
LGBT-related podcasts